Good By Sunday is the sixth album by the Filipino Band, 6 Cyclemind, released under Universal Records and Soupstar Music on June 9, 2012. This is the first album that does not feature Ney Dimaculangan, who departed ways with the band after their previous album and went solo. The album also features new sessionists to replace the members who parted ways with the band.

The album contains 11 tracks. It has not been well-received by some of their avid listeners, due to sounding with a more different musical style than the other material that the audience used to listen under Ney's lead, and also Sony Music Philippines went on a hiatus that time.

Track listing

Personnel
Tutti Caringal - vocals
Rye Sarmiento - rhythm guitar
Bob Cañamo - bass guitar
Herbert Hernandez - lead guitar
Vic Aquino - drums

Release history

References

2012 albums
6cyclemind albums